Thomas Garrard may refer to:

Thomas Gerrard or Garrard
Sir Thomas Garrard, 2nd Baronet (1627–c. 1690), of the Garrard baronets